Pandua is a community development block that forms an administrative division in Chinsurah subdivision of Hooghly district in the Indian state of West Bengal.

Overview
Pandua CD Block is part of the Hooghly-Damodar Plain, one of the three natural regions in the district of the flat alluvial plains that forms part of the Gangetic Delta. The region has many depressions which receive water from the surrounding lands during the rainy season and discharge the water through small channels.

Geography

Pandua CD Block is bounded by Kalna II CD Block, in Bardhaman district, in the north, Balagarh and Chinsurah Mogra CD Blocks  the east, Polba Dadpur CD Block in the south and Dhaniakhali and Memari I CD Block, the latter in Bardhaman district, in the west.

It is located 27 km from Chinsurah, the district headquarters.

The Pandua CD Block has an area of 276.43 km2. It has 1 panchayat samity, 16 gram panchayats, 247 gram sansads (village councils), 157 mouzas and 163 inhabited villages. Pandua police station serves this block. Headquarters of this CD Block is at Pandua.

Gram panchayats of Pandua block/ panchayat samiti are: Batika-Boinchee, Belun-Damasin, Berala-Konchmali, Haral-Daspur, Ilosova-Daspur, Itachuna-Khanyan, Jamgram-Mondalal, Jamna, Jayar-Dwarbasini, Khirkundi-Namajgram-Niala, Panchghora-Toregram, Pandua, Rameswarpur-Gopalnagar, Sarai-Tinna, Sikhara-Champta and Simlagarh-Vitasin.

Demographics

Population
As per 2011 Census of India Pandua CD Block had a total population of 316,197, of which 265,863 were rural and 50,334 were urban. There were 159,323 (50%) males and 156,874 (50%) females. Population below 6 years was 31,838. Scheduled Castes numbered 101,302 (32.04%) and Scheduled Tribes numbered 48,555 (15.36%).

As per 2001 census, Pandua block had a total population of 283,004, out of which 142,487 were males and 140,517 were females. Pandua block registered a population growth of 16.12 per cent during the 1991-2001 decade. Decadal growth for Hooghly district was 15.72 per cent. Decadal growth in West Bengal was 17.84 per cent.

Census Towns in Pandua CD Block (2011 census figures in brackets): Batika (8,717), Pandua (30,700), Purusattompur (3,665) and Namajgram (7,252).

Large villages (with 4,000+ population) in Pandua CD Block (2011 census figures in brackets): Berela (6,712), Bainchi (13,063), Sarai (4,043), Tinna (6,131), Champahati (6,128), Pontba (4,237), Haral (4,521), Rameswarpur (4,821), Dwarbasini (5,256), Khanyan (9,575) and Ilchobi (4,136).

Other villages in Pandua CD Block include (2011 census figures in brackets): Daspur (2,088), Belun (3,257), Itachuna (1,451), Gopalnagar (2,807), Jamgram (2,753), Torgram (2,467) and Panchgara (1,919).

Literacy
As per the 2011 census the total number of literates in Pandua CD Block was 215,701 (75.86% of the population over 6 years) out of which males numbered 117,603 (82.22% of the male population over 6 years) and females numbered 98,098 (69.41% of the female population over 6 years). The gender disparity (the difference between female and male literacy rates) was 12.81%.
As per the 2001 census, Pandua block had a total literacy of 47.34 per cent. While male literacy was 66.05 per cent, female literacy was 58.35 per cent.

See also – List of West Bengal districts ranked by literacy rate

Language and religion
As per the 2001 census, Bengali is the mother tongue for 86.4% of the population of the district followed by Hindi at 7.9%. Santali at 2.6% and Urdu at 2.0%, are the two other major languages spoken in the district. The population who reported Bengali as a mother tongue has decreased from 88.1% in 1961 to 86.4% in 2001 census whereas the population who reported Hindi as mother tongue has increased from 5.8% in 1961 to 7.9% in 2001 census.

As per the 2011 census, majority of the population of the district belong to the Hindu community with a population share of 82.9% followed by Muslims at 15.8%. The percentage of the Hindu population of the district has followed a decreasing trend from 87.1% in 1961 to 82.9% in the latest census 2011. On the other hand, the percentage of Muslim population has increased from 12.7% in 1961 to 15.8% in 2011 census.

In 2011 census Hindus numbered 216,134 and formed 68.48% of the population in Pandua CD Block. Muslims numbered 76,357 and formed 24.15% of the population. Others numbered 23,006 and formed 7.27% of the population.

Rural poverty
As per poverty estimates obtained from household survey for families living below poverty line in 2005, rural poverty  in Pandua CD Block was 34.30%.

Economy

Livelihood

In Pandua CD Block in 2011, amongst the class of total workers, cultivators formed  11.82%, agricultural labourers 51.33%, household industry workers 3.80% and other workers 33.05%.

Infrastructure
There are 153 inhabited villages in Pandua CD Block. 100% villages have power supply. 85 villages have more than one source of drinking water (tap, well, tube well, hand pump), 55 villages have only tube well/ borewell, 16 villages have only hand pump and 1 village has only well. 25 Villages have post offices, 16 villages have sub post offices and 12 villages have post and telegraph offices. 111 villages have landlines, 108 villages have public call offices and 124 villages have mobile phone coverage. 83 villages have pucca roads and 56 villages have bus service (public/ private). 37 villages have agricultural credit societies and 23 villages have commercial/ co-operative banks.

Agriculture
This is a rich agricultural area with several cold storages. Though rice is the prime crop of the district, the agricultural economy largely depends on potato, jute, vegetables, and orchard products. Though potato is cultivated in all the blocks of this district Dhaniakhali, Arambagh, Goghat, Pursurah, Haripal, Polba-Dadpur, Tarakeswar, Pandua and Singur contributed much of its production of this district.

Some of the primary and other hats or markets in the Pandua block area are at: Boinchi, Khanyan, Pandua and Simlagarh.

The Tebhaga movement launched in 1946, in 24 Parganas district, aimed at securing for the share-croppers a better position within the existing land relation structure. Although the subsequent Bargadari Act of 1950 recognised the rights of bargadars to a higher share of crops from the land that they tilled, it was not implemented fully. Large tracts, beyond the prescribed limit of land ceiling, remained with the rich landlords. From 1977 onwards major land reforms took place in West Bengal. Land in excess of land ceiling was acquired and distributed amongst the peasants.

Following land reforms land ownership pattern has undergone transformation. In 2013-14, persons engaged in agriculture in Pandua CD Block could be classified as follows: bargadars 7.73%, patta (document) holders 7.29%, small farmers (possessing land between 1 and 2 hectares) 3.07%, marginal farmers (possessing land up to 1 hectare) 19.40% and agricultural labourers 62.51%.

Pandua CD Block had 127 fertiliser depots, 54 seed stores and 61 fair price shops in 2013-14.

In 2013-14, Pandua CD Block produced 4,608 tonnes of Aman paddy, the main winter crop from 1,846 hectares, 34,119 tonnes of Boro paddy (spring crop) from 11,592 hectares, 1,980 tonnes of Aus paddy (summer crop) from 800 hectares and 288,975 tonnes of potatoes from 10,461 hectares. It also produced oilseeds.

In 2013-14, the total area irrigated in Pandua CD Block was 29,092 hectares, out of which 15,175 hectares were irrigated by canal water, 1,850 hectares by tank water, 860 hectares by river lift irrigation, 4,040 hectares by deep tube wells and 7,167 hectares by shallow tube wells.

Banking
In 2013-14, Pandua CD Block had offices of 14 commercial banks and 3 gramin banks.

Transport
Pandua CD Block has 1 ferry service and 12 originating/ terminating bus routes.

Howrah-Bardhaman main line was made operable from Howrah to Raniganj in 1855. There are stations at Khanyan, Pundooah, Simlagarh, Bainchigram and Bainchi. It is part of the Kolkata Suburban Railway network.

SH 13/ GT Road passes through this block.

Education
In 2013-14, Pandua CD Block had 185 primary schools with 18,168 students, 8 middle schools with 848 students, 25 high schools with 15,116 students and 13 higher secondary schools with 18,312 students. Pandua CD Block had 1 general college with 4,368 students, 4 technical/ professional institutions with 461 students and 613 institutions for special and non-formal education with 12,382 students

Bejoy Narayan Mahavidyalaya, a general degree college, was established at Itachuna in 1950.

In Pandua CD Block, amongst the 153 inhabited villages, 12 had no school, 59 had more than 1 primary school, 103 had at least 1 primary school, 38 had at least 1 primary and 1 middle school and 30 had at least 1 middle and 1 secondary school.

Healthcare
In 2014, Pandua CD Block had 1 rural hospital, 6 primary health centres and 4 private nursing homes with total 45 beds and 9 doctors (excluding private bodies). It had 51 family welfare subcentres. 11,327 patients were treated indoor and 410,244 patients were treated outdoor in the hospitals, health centres and subcentres of the CD Block.

Pandua CD Block has Pandua Rural Hospital (with 30 beds) at Pandua, B.L.Mukherjee Primary Health Centre  (Boinchigram) at Boinchi (with 10 beds), Itachuna PHC at Itachuna (with 10 beds), Dwarbasini PHC (with 4 beds), Ramswarpur-Gopalnagar PHC at PO Chandpur (with 10 beds), Haraldaspur PHC at PO Hatni (with 10 beds) and Jamgram PHC (with 6 beds).

Pandua CD Block is one of the areas of Hooghly district where ground water is affected by moderate level of arsenic contamination. The WHO guideline for arsenic in drinking water is 10 mg/ litre, and the Indian Standard value is 50 mg/ litre. In Hooghly district, 16 blocks have arsenic levels above WHO guidelines and 11 blocks above Indian standard value. The maximum concentration in Pandua CD Block is 61 mg/litre.

References

Community development blocks in Chinsurah subdivision